Tennent Reef, also known as Pigeon Reef,; Tiên Nữ Reef;  Mandarin , is a reef on the Spratly Islands in the South China Sea. The reef has been occupied by Vietnam since 1988. It is also claimed by China (PRC), the Philippines, Vietnam, and Taiwan (ROC).

See also
Spratly Islands dispute

References

External links
Maritime Transparency Initiative Island Tracker

Reefs of the Spratly Islands
Reefs of Vietnam